Torynorrhina opalina are beetles from the family Scarabaeidae, subfamily Cetoniinae.

Description
Torynorrhina opalina can reach a length of 30–32 mm. The basic colour of this species is yellowis-orange, the elytra are elongate, subparallel and punctured and the legs are dark greenish.

Distribution
This species can be found in North India and in Tibet.

References
 Biolib
 Global species
 World Field Guide
  Torynorrhina opalina on Flickr

Cetoniinae
Beetles described in 1831